Samad Niamat (9 December 1912 – 5 August 1984) was a Trinidadian cricketer. He played in one first-class match for Trinidad and Tobago in 1940/41.

See also
 List of Trinidadian representative cricketers

References

External links
 

1912 births
1984 deaths
Trinidad and Tobago cricketers